The 2020 Africa Magic Viewers' Choice Awards were held on March 14, 2020 at Eko Hotel and Suites, Lagos.

The nominees were revealed on February 6, 2020. There were 28 categories and seven of those categories were open to public voting. 21 of the categories were decided by the AMVCA panel of judges. The MultiChoice Talent Factory Award was included as a new category.

Awards 

Nominees are listed below. All winners are highlighted in boldface.

References

Entertainment events in Nigeria
2020 in Nigerian cinema
Africa Magic
21st century in Lagos
Africa Magic Viewers' Choice Awards ceremonies